Siege of Avignon may refer to:

Siege of Avignon (500), during Clovis I's war with the Burgundians
Siege of Avignon (567), during a Frankish civil war
Siege of Avignon (583), during the revolt of Gundoald
Siege of Avignon (737), during the Umayyad invasion of Gaul
Siege of Avignon (1226), during the Albigensians Crusades